Clavidesmus is a genus of longhorn beetles of the subfamily Lamiinae, containing the following species:

 Clavidesmus chicae Giorgi, 1998
 Clavidesmus columbianus Breuning, 1961
 Clavidesmus funerarius (Lane, 1958) 
 Clavidesmus heterocerus (Buquet, 1852)
 Clavidesmus indistinctus Dillon & Dillon, 1952
 Clavidesmus lichenigerus (Lane, 1958)
 Clavidesmus metallicus (Thomson, 1868)
 Clavidesmus monnei Giorgi, 1998
 Clavidesmus rubigineus Dillon & Dillon, 1949

References

Onciderini